Rudd Township is one of twelve townships in Floyd County, Iowa, USA.  As of the 2000 census, its population was 693.

Geography
According to the United States Census Bureau, Rudd Township covers an area of 35.24 square miles (91.28 square kilometers).

Cities, towns, villages
 Rudd

Adjacent townships
 Floyd Township (east)
 Ulster Township (south)
 Rockford Township (southwest)
 Rock Grove Township (west)
 Cedar Township, Mitchell County (northwest)

Cemeteries
The township contains Evergreen Cemetery.

Major highways
  U.S. Route 18

Airports and landing strips
 Folkerts Airport

School districts
 Osage Community School District
 Rudd-Rockford-Marble Rk Community School District

Political districts
 Iowa's 4th congressional district
 State House District 14
 State Senate District 7

References
 United States Census Bureau 2008 TIGER/Line Shapefiles
 United States Board on Geographic Names (GNIS)
 United States National Atlas

External links
 US-Counties.com
 City-Data.com

Townships in Floyd County, Iowa
Townships in Iowa